Roannay is a river in Belgium. It flows for  through the province of Liège in the northern-central part of the country.

Rivers of the Ardennes (Belgium)
Rivers of Belgium
Rivers of Liège Province